The Embassy of the State of Palestine in Kazakhstan is the diplomatic mission of Palestine in Kazakhstan. It is located in Astana.

See also

List of diplomatic missions in Kazakhstan
List of diplomatic missions of Palestine

References

Kazakhstan
Palestine, the State of
Kazakhstan–State of Palestine relations